Pedro Urrutia (born 23 December 1986) is a film director and Dominican publisher.

Pedro Urrutia began working in the film industry after 19 years of working in highly renowned local movie productions in the Dominican Republic. He worked as a post-production assistant, grip, program producer and editor, among other things.

Career
In 2008, just before completing his studies at the Universidad Iberoamericana del Caribe for a degree in advertising communication, he began to apply to film universities abroad. He learned of a grant from director Brett Ratner to study at the New York Film Academy and applied for the grant. The Ratner full scholarship hosted a one-year film-making program for all of 2009.

In 2010, at 23 years old, he returned to the Dominican Republic and founded Ave Studio, a production company specializing in video clips. He was nominated for the 2011 Casandra Awards for the video clip "Vakeró – Que mujer tan chula". In the same year, Pedro Urrutia and Ave Studio's first video clip opened the doors to a voting member of the Latin Academy of Recording Arts & Sciences. Because of this, in 2013, the Soberano Awards (previously the Casandra Awards) nominated "Melymel – En Francés" for video clip of the year.

The video clip also went to the national and international level, entering into top international music programming channels, such as Hispanic Television, NBC Universo, MTV, MTV Latin America, MTV Tres, and Ritmoson Latino, among others. In 2012, however, Urrutia changed course and began to work on what he was really passionate about: cinema. He began working on an idea for his debut, Código Paz. In the same year, he created film production company One Alliance, under terms protected by the film laws of the Dominican Republic.

In 2014, Urrutia assumed control of his debut, Código Paz. The film is of the action genre, which is a new to the Dominican cinema; but it had a very good reception from the local public as well as the approval of two important local cinema chains, Caribbean Cinemas and Palacio del Cine. It was the first Dominican film to open simultaneously in theaters nationwide.

Código Paz has allowed a selection of Urrutia's films to represent the Dominican Republic in the 2015 Goya Awards in the Best Latin American Film category. Código Paz was nominated by the José María Forqué Awards 2015 for the Best Latin American Feature category; it was also nominated for the 2014 La Silla Awards, receiving nine awards, including Best Picture, Best Director, Best, Best Producer, Best Screenplay, Best Editing, Best Sound Design, Best Makeup, Best Supporting Actor, and Best Supporting Actress, thus becoming the most awarded film of the award. Recently, the Dominican Association of Art Historians nominated Código Paz for the Soberano Awards, for Best Picture, Best Director, Best Film Actor and Best Film Actress.

Filmography

Films

Music videos

Awards

References

1986 births
Living people
Dominican Republic film directors
Dominican Republic people of Basque descent